Isaabad (also Romanized as ‘Īsáābād; also known as Asáābād and Āsīāābād) is a village in Dastjerd Rural District, Khalajastan District, Qom County, Qom Province, Iran. At the 2006 census, its population was 123, in 47 families.

References 

Populated places in Qom Province